Alexander Maes (born 12 March 1992) is a Belgian professional footballer who plays as a winger for RC Hades in the Belgian Division 2.

Club career
Maes started his career with Willem II.

He signed with Romanian club Argeș Pitești in October 2020, after having played for Beerschot for four seasons.

On 12 April 2021, Maes signed a one-year contract with Lierse Kempenzonen in the Belgian First Division B, with an option for an additional year.

On 31 January 2022, Maes returned to RC Hades in the fourth-tier Belgian Division 2 on a 3.5-year contract.

References

External links
 

1993 births
Living people
Belgian footballers
Challenger Pro League players
Willem II (football club) players
K Beerschot VA players
FC Argeș Pitești players
Lierse Kempenzonen players
Liga I players
Association football wingers
Belgian expatriate sportspeople in the Netherlands
Expatriate footballers in the Netherlands
Belgian expatriate sportspeople in Romania
Expatriate footballers in Romania
Sportspeople from Genk
Footballers from Limburg (Belgium)